Gurmat Parkash is a monthly Punjabi magazine published by Dharam Prachar Committee of Shiromani Gurdwara Parbandhak Committee, Amritsar. Its Hindi version is popularly known as Gurmat Gyan. This magazine covers various researched articles by different scholars on philosophical, historical and theological aspect of Sikh Religion. It also covers research articles on Sikh personalities, Events and present situations of Sikhs and Sikhism around the world.

References

External links
 Official Website

Monthly magazines published in India
Religious magazines
Hindi-language magazines
Magazines with year of establishment missing